André Schmidt (born 1 February 1989, in Zeulenroda) is a German former professional footballer who played as a defender.

References

Living people
1989 births
German footballers
Association football defenders
FC Carl Zeiss Jena players
2. Bundesliga players
3. Liga players